Hemisquilla californiensis is a species of mantis shrimp native to the northern Pacific.

Behaviour 
Low-frequency sounds ("rumbles") emitted by H. californiensis are spectrally similar to the sounds produced by African and Asian elephants, in a range of 20–60 Hz with a strong secondary harmonic frequency. The species appears to produce this rumble by contracting a posterior muscle connected to a stiff extension of the carapace. The sides of the carapace are covered in large red polarized spots which vibrate during the rumble, suggesting that the sound may generate both vibrational and visual signals. It may be used to interact with predators and burrow intruders as a defensive or territorial measure.

It has been suggested that constant and overlapping noise from boats and other anthropogenic sources may threaten the effectiveness of this type of signaling, however little is known about the exact function and to which degree it is impacted by such disturbances.

Like all mantis shrimps, Hemisquilla species have compound eyes divided into two peripheral retinal regions (dorsal and ventral hemispheres) and one mid-band region. A behavioral study of H. californiensis found that animals studied responded to moving targets under white, blue, and green light, but were less sensitive to red light and had no measurable response to infrared light. Overall, the animals studied responded to targets rotating horizontally across their field of vision with a quick startle response noticeable in their eyes/antennules, but there was no tracking of targets with their eyes. It was therefore concluded that H. californiensis uses monochromatic vision in its peripheral hemispheres to recognize objects, and the mid-band's sharper color receptors, if light conditions allow, add supplemental information to create a more detailed picture.

References

Stomatopoda
Crustaceans of North America